Ascension 7: Rocketship to Heaven is a live album by Dighayzoose. It captures their performance at Cornerstone 1994 show as presented.

Track listing
 "Intro / Dancing In Concert With The Infinite" – 5:07
 "Strugglefish" – 5:00
 "Slow Serious" – 4:35
 "Whoo Woo" – 0:14
 "Slatherage" – 7:53
 "Magentamantalovetree" – 14:17
 "Self" – 1:25
 "Beware Of Strangers Bearing Gifts" – 0:27
 "Later (L.A. 1994)" – 3:52
 "Circle Of Pain" – 4:37
 "Secret" – 4:30
 "Intro To Regret" – 1:34
 "Regret" – 5:38

Credits
Phil - vocals, toy megaphone
Dave Anderson - Guitar, vocals
Jim Florez - Drums, vocals
Bil Brown - Bass vocals
Zoop - guitars

Guests:
Dan Michaels - sax, vocals on "woo"
Allan Aguirre - vocals and gifts

Production:
Recorded & Engineered: Buckeye the cat
Mixed by Bill Crain, BRC Audio Productions, Kansas City, MO
Edited & Mastered: Buddy Miller, Nashville, TN
Art: Bil Brown
Layout and design: Bil Brown and Brad Springer

"Self" and "Later" are by Scaterd Few.

Christian rock albums by American artists
1995 live albums
DigHayZoose albums